Daniel Engelbrecht (born 5 November 1990) is a German retired professional footballer who played as a forward.

Club career
On 20 July 2013, while playing his second game of the 2014–15 season for the Stuttgarter Kickers against Rot-Weiß Erfurt, Engelbrecht suddenly collapsed on the pitch due to a sudden heart attack. He was later diagnosed with myocarditis and chronic heart rhythm disorders. After four operations to the heart, including one where a defibrillator was implanted and a waiting period of 17 months, Engelbrecht returned to the pitch on 15 November 2014. He is the first professional football player to play with an implanted defibrillator in Germany.
On 6 December 2014, Daniel Engelbrecht shot the winning goal against SV Wehen Wiesbaden in the 91st minute, thereby becoming the only professional footballer to score a goal with such a handicap.

Following the recurrence of his heart problems, Engelbrecht announced that he would interrupt his career on doctor's recommendation, and that he would focus on becoming a coach. This interruption turned into permanent retirement in 2018, when it became known that Engelbrecht's defibrillator had already brought him back to life on three occasions.

Managerial career
On 1 July 2019, Engelbrecht was announced as the new head of VfL Bochum's youth talent scouting division.

Career statistics

References

External links
 

1990 births
Living people
Footballers from Cologne
German footballers
Association football forwards
Alemannia Aachen players
VfL Bochum II players
VfL Bochum players
Stuttgarter Kickers players
TSV Steinbach Haiger players
Rot-Weiss Essen players
2. Bundesliga players
3. Liga players
Regionalliga players